Undercover Man is a 1942 American Western film directed by Lesley Selander and starring William Boyd.  The film is a serial Western and part of the Hopalong Cassidy series.  It is the 44th entry in a series of 66 films.

Plot

Cast
 William Boyd as Hopalong Cassidy
 Andy Clyde as California Carlson
 Jay Kirby as Breezy Travers
 Antonio Moreno as Don Thomas Gonzales
 Nora Lane as Doña Louise Saunders
 Chris-Pin Martin as Miguel
 Esther Estrella as Dolores Gonzales
 John Vosper as Deputy Ed Carson
 Eva Puig as Rosita Lopez
 Alan Baldwin as Bob Saunders
 Jack Rockwell as Capt. John Hawkins
 Pierce Lyden as Henchman Bart
 Rony Roux as Chavez

References

External links
 
 
 
 

1942 films
1940s English-language films
1942 Western (genre) films
United Artists films
American black-and-white films
Films directed by Lesley Selander
American Western (genre) films
Hopalong Cassidy films
Films scored by Paul Sawtell
1940s American films